Plancheite is a hydrated copper silicate mineral with the formula Cu8Si8O22(OH)4•(H2O). It is closely related to shattuckite in structure and appearance, and the two minerals are often confused.

Structure
Plancheite is a chain silicate (inosilicate), with double chains of silica tetrahedra parallel to the c crystal axis.   It occurs as sprays of acicular or fibrous radial clusters, with fibers extended parallel to the chains, i.e. along the c crystal axis; it can also form tiny tabular or platy crystals.  It is a member of the orthorhombic crystal class m m m (2/m 2/m 2/m), which is the most symmetrical class in the orthorhombic system.

Properties
Usually a pale turquoise-blue, with a pale blue streak and an adamantine to silky luster. It is quite hard, with hardness 5.5 to 6, close to that of feldspar, and specific gravity 3.6 to 3.8.  Optically it is biaxial (+), with refractive indices between 1.64 and 1.74, and pleochroic.

Environment
Plancheite is a secondary mineral formed in the oxidized zone of copper deposits, associated with other copper minerals chrysocolla, dioptase, malachite, conichalcite and tenorite.  It occurs with primary malachite at the Milpillas Mine in Mexico.  The type locality is the Sanda Mine, Mindouli, Pool Region, Republic of Congo.

References

External links
JMol: http://rruff.geo.arizona.edu/AMS/viewJmol.php?id=00578

Copper(II) minerals
Inosilicates